Basketball was inducted at the Youth Olympic Games at the inaugural edition in 2010 for both boys and girls. The tournaments use the FIBA 3x3 rules. The program also includes skill challenge.

Boys

Summaries

Team appearances

Dunk contest

Girls

Summaries

Team appearances

Shoot-out contest

Medal table
As of the 2018 Summer Youth Olympics.

See also
Basketball at the Summer Olympics

External links
Youth Olympic Games

 
Sports at the Summer Youth Olympics
Youth Olympic Games
Youth Olympic Games
Youth Olympic Games
Olympics